Tim Johnson (born May 15, 1962) is an American football coach and former player. He played high school football at Rockhurst High School in Kansas City, Missouri, and college football at William Jewell College from 1981 to 1984. He was an All-American linebacker and Academic All-American. He was inducted into the William Jewell College Athletic Hall of Fame in 2005.  Johnson also played in Finland and later coached in Europe as well.

Europe
In 1985, Johnson signed with and played professionally for the East City Giants of Finland's Vaahteraliiga. He also played two seasons for the Helsinki Roosters and later coached in the league for various teams and other European leagues.

Coaching
In 1996 he returned to the USA for a coaching position. Later Johnson started a college coaching career.
 
In 1999 Johnson was hired by Avila University in Kansas City, Missouri to start the school's football program. He served as head football coach at Avila from 2000 until 2004, compiling a record of 17–30. In 2004, he took Avila to the Wheat Bowl, its first bowl game, losing to Midland Lutheran by a score of 31–9. Johnson's 2003 team went 5–5, completing the only non-losing season in Avila's history as a National Association of Intercollegiate Athletics (NAIA) participant.

Head coaching record

References

1962 births
Living people
American football linebackers
Avila Eagles football coaches
William Jewell Cardinals football players
Players of American football from Kansas City, Missouri
American expatriate sportspeople in Finland
American expatriate players of American football
Sportspeople from Kansas City, Missouri